Yelvington may refer to:

Yelvington, Florida
Yelvington, Kentucky
Yelvington (surname)